Micranthes californica  (syn: Saxifraga californica), known by the common name California saxifrage, is a species of flowering plants.

It is native to much of California west and north of the desert regions, as well as adjacent sections of southern Oregon and northern Baja California. It grows in many types of moist habitat from the coast to the mountains.

Description
Micranthes californica is a perennial herb producing a small gray-green basal rosette of thick toothed oval leaves up to 10 centimeters long.

The inflorescence arises on a peduncle up to 35 centimeters tall bearing clusters of flowers, sometimes all on one side. Each flower has five green to reddish sepals, five small white petals, and ten stamens at the center.

References

External links
Jepson Manual Treatment of Micranthes californica
Micranthes californica Photo gallery

californica
Flora of California
Flora of Oregon
Flora of Baja California
Flora of the Cascade Range
Flora of the Klamath Mountains
Flora of the Sierra Nevada (United States)
Natural history of the California chaparral and woodlands
Natural history of the California Coast Ranges
Natural history of the Peninsular Ranges
Natural history of the San Francisco Bay Area
Natural history of the Santa Monica Mountains
Natural history of the Transverse Ranges
Flora without expected TNC conservation status